is the fourteenth single by Japanese rock musician Kazuya Yoshii, released on October 7, 2015 by Triad/Nippon Columbia. It is the first opening theme song of the Dragon Ball Super anime series. The single reached number 13 on both the Oricon Singles Chart and Billboards Japan Hot 100.

Details
Yoshii composed the music for "Chōzetsu Dynamic!", while its lyrics were penned by Yukinojo Mori, who has written numerous songs for the Dragon Ball franchise. The song was recorded in Los Angeles with American musicians Alain Johannes, Chris Chaney and Josh Freese. "Chōzetsu Dynamic!" was used as the opening theme song for the first 76 episodes of Dragon Ball Super.

The single also includes a cover of "Romantic Ageru yo", the closing theme of the original Dragon Ball anime, instrumental versions of these two songs, and an English-language version of the title track. Yoshii's The Yellow Monkey bandmate, Hideaki Kikuchi, performs guitar on "Romantic Ageru yo".

The limited edition of the single, which has a slightly different cover, comes with a DVD that includes the music videos for "Chōzetsu Dynamic!" and his previous single "Clear", as well as two versions of the video for "(Everybody is) Like a Starlight".

Track listing

Personnel 
Kazuya Yoshii – vocals and guitar on all tracks
Alain Johannes – guitar on "Chōzetsu Dynamic!"
Chris Chaney – bass on "Chōzetsu Dynamic!"
Josh Freese – drums on "Chōzetsu Dynamic!"
Hideaki Kikuchi – guitar on "Romantic Ageru yo"
Jungo Miura (Petrolz) – bass on "Romantic Ageru yo"
Yoshifumi Yoshida (Triceratops) – drums on "Romantic Ageru yo"
Simon Isogai – keyboards on "Romantic Ageru yo"

Charts

References

External links 
 

2015 singles
2015 songs
Columbia Records singles
Dragon Ball songs
Japanese-language songs
Japanese rock songs
Animated series theme songs
Children's television theme songs
Songs written by Yukinojo Mori